Samantha Magee (born July 10, 1983, in Hartford, Connecticut) is an American rower.

References 
 
 

1983 births
Living people
Sportspeople from Hartford, Connecticut
Rowers at the 2004 Summer Olympics
Olympic silver medalists for the United States in rowing
American female rowers
Medalists at the 2004 Summer Olympics
World Rowing Championships medalists for the United States
21st-century American women